Râmeț is a commune located in Alba County, Transylvania, Romania. It is composed of thirteen villages: Boțani, Brădești (Fenyősremete), Cheia (Remeteiszoros), Cotorăști, Florești, Olteni (Szabaderdő), Râmeț, Valea Făgetului, Valea Inzelului, Valea Mănăstirii (Remetekolostor), Valea Poienii, Valea Uzei and Vlădești.

Tourist attractions include:
 The Romanian Orthodox Râmeț Monastery, with the old church dating to the 14th century.
 Nature reserve "Cheile Râmeților" (40 ha).
 Nature reserve "Cheile Pravului" (3 ha), in Cheia.
 Nature reserve "Cheile Piatra Bălții" (2 ha), in Cheia.
 Nature reserve "Cheile Mănăstirii" (15 ha), in Valea Mănăstirii.
 Nature reserve  "Vânătările Ponorului", near the Bedeleu peak in the Trascău Mountains.

References

Communes in Alba County
Localities in Transylvania